Kim Dong-baek (born 18 August 1941) is a South Korean alpine skier. He competed in two events at the 1964 Winter Olympics.

References

1941 births
Living people
South Korean male alpine skiers
Olympic alpine skiers of South Korea
Alpine skiers at the 1964 Winter Olympics
20th-century South Korean people